Wictor Petersson (born 1 May 1998) is a Swedish athlete specialising in the shot put. He represented his country at the 2019 World Championships in Doha without reaching the final. Earlier that year he won a bronze medal at the European U23 Championships.

His personal bests in the event are 20.70 metres outdoors (Azusa 2019) and 19.78 metres indoors (Malmö 2019).

International competitions

References

1998 births
Living people
Swedish male shot putters
World Athletics Championships athletes for Sweden
Swedish Athletics Championships winners
Athletes (track and field) at the 2020 Summer Olympics
Olympic athletes of Sweden
21st-century Swedish people